This is a list of Indian states and territories ranked by the availability of toilet facilities per household. Figures are from the 2011 census of India.

The Ministry of Housing and Urban Affairs (MoHUA), is presently implementing missions like Swachh Bharat Mission (SBM), Atal Mission for Rejuvenation & Urban Transformation (AMRUT), Smart Cities Mission, and National Heritage City Development & Augmentation Yojana (HRIDAY).

List of the Indian States and UT
An increasing trend has been seen in India with how many households have toilet facilities.

However, a report from National Statistical Office found this data controversial stating "More than a quarter of households surveyed in rural India (in 2017) didn't have access to a toilet." However, it's important to highlight a caveat about its findings: the report says the question about access to toilets was asked straight after a question about receiving state benefits. "There may be an inherent tendency to give a negative reply to these questions," it says, in the expectation "that this may help get additional benefits through government schemes".

Kerala, Mizoram, and Lakshadweep State/UT have a higher number of households having toilet facilities in both 2001 and 2011 in comparison to other states. Lakshadweep has the highest households having toilet facilities 89.2% in 2001, 97.8% in 2011, and 100% in 2017.

Seven states viz. Bihar, Odisha, Assam, Goa, and Tripura are below the national estimate of 25.21% in 2019. According to 2019 data, 25.21% of the country has achieved ODF Status and has full access to toilets.

References

External links 

https://visualize.data.gov.in/?inst=872a4c11-f55c-4fec-8d30-8f0205e11821&vid=603

States and union territories of India-related lists
Lists of subdivisions of India
Social issues in India
Health in India by state or union territory
Water supply and sanitation in India
India